Wuqiu (Wuchiu, Wuciou, Ockseu) (Puxian Min: Ou-chhiu, Hakka: Vû-hiu-hiông) is a group of islands comprising two major islands, namely Greater Qiu Islet and Smaller Qiu Islet, in the Taiwan Strait. Administratively, Wuqiu Township is a rural township which is part of Kinmen County (Quemoy), Fukien of the Republic of China (Taiwan) nominally de jure part of Putian County. Greater Qiu Island is the site of the Wuqiu Lighthouse.

History

In the early 1400s, Wuqiu was known as a marker on the sailing route between China and the Ryukyu Islands.

As of 1843, a "considerable fishing village" existed in Ockseu (Wuqiu).

The Wuqiu Lighthouse was built in 1874, directed by David Marr Henderson.

In September 1910, the center of a typhoon swept over Niushan Island (Turnabout Island) and Wuqiu (Ockseu) or a few miles to the southeast.

Wuqiu Township was originally part of Putian County with many of its residents emigrating from the county. After the end of Chinese Civil War in 1949, Wuqiu became disconnected from Putian. Control of Ockseu and other insular areas was shared between the KMT and anti-Communist guerrillas.

In June 1954, the township was provisionally reassigned to Kinmen (Quemoy) County.

In 1954, Wuchiu was shelled and attacked by the Chinese Communists on several occasions.

On February 25, 1955, Chinese Communist ships shelled Wuchiu.

On June 21, 1955, Nationalist planes heavily damaged a 40-ton tugboat at Wuchiu.

In February 1956, there were reports that the 480-man guerrilla force on Wuchiu would be evacuated. The Wuchiu Islands were seen as "highly vulnerable to Communist strikes" and "of little military value to the Nationalists."

Once the War Affairs Committee was founded in July 1956, strong and complete foundation for war affairs was built in the township.

In February 1957, the British cargo ship Hydralock ran aground off Ockseu Island. All 31 crew abandoned ship, but then disappeared. They were later discovered safe on Haitan Island.

In the summer of 1965, then-Minister of National Defense Chiang Ching-kuo visited the island as part of an inspection.

Late on the night of November 13, 1965, the Nationalist patrol boat Yungtai and the minesweeper Yungchang were on patrol southwest of the islands covering amphibious boats that were unloading supplies to Wuchiu. At just after midnight, eight Chinese Communist boats (three escort destroyers and five gunboats) coming from Quanzhou (Chuanchou) attacked the two Nationalist boats (烏坵海戰). The Yungchang was sunk almost immediately with fifteen survivors who were rescued by the USS O'Brien. Yungtai sunk four of the Communist gunboats but was scrapped due to excessive damage from the engagement.

In the early morning of March 20, 1974, Lt. Wu Miao-huo defected to the PRC. He took a rubber speedboat from Wuchiu to Nanjih Island. Wu wasn't able to get along with his superior officers.

Martial law was lifted from the township on 7 November 1992.

On 29 January 1994, Wuqiu residents had their first election to elect the fourth head of Wuqiu Township. And on 16 July 1994, the residents had their first election to elect the fourth village heads of Daqiu Village and Xiaoqiu Village.

In November 1994, General Li Kai, commander of the troops at Wuqiu, committed suicide.

During the Third Taiwan Strait Crisis in 1996, military sources in Taipei expected China to attack a small Taiwan-held island. The most likely target was Wuchiu, then garrisoned by 500 soldiers. The outlying islands were placed on high alert.

In 1998, Zero Chou produced a documentary about the islands called Yi Shi Zai Hai Xia Zhong ("Lost in the Strait") (Chinese: 遺失在海峽中：烏坵, 48 mins).

On December 26, 2001, President Chen Shui-bian visited Wuqiu and delivered remarks. Chen was the first president to visit Wuqiu during their presidency.

In 2012, Wuqiu, along with Daren Township in Taitung County, was proposed by the Ministry of Economic Affairs as the candidate of the new disposal site of nuclear waste after the Lanyu Storage Site in Orchid Island, Taitung County. This proposal however received heavy objection from the local Wuqiu residents.

On July 23, 2017, after a period of sixty years in which the lighthouse remained disused, the Wuqiu Lighthouse resumed service.

On August 24, 2017, Chen Fu-Hai, then-magistrate of Kinmen County, visited the Wuqiu Township Office.

On the night of August 2, 2019, a cargo ship in port at Wuqiu struck a tetrapod in choppy waves. The ship sank but the thirteen crew members were rescued by the Wuqiu Islands Garrison Command.

In March 2020, the Kinmen County Animal and Plant Health Inspection and Quarantine Office sent five persons to Wuqiu to sterilize five dogs on the island in order to prevent the dogs from breeding and causing problems for the residents.

On March 29, 2020, at about 3:55 PM, a capsized ship from mainland China, Haifa 88, which had entered Wuqiu's restricted waters on March 9, broke free from the anchorage holding it in place and floated away. On March 9 at 7:32 AM, the ship had been in a collision with another larger ship from mainland China, Minshiyu 07725, in Wuqiu's restricted waters, and the four man crew of the ship were rescued at that time.

In late April 2020, Magistrate Yang Cheng-wu visited Wuqiu for the first time as magistrate and stayed overnight.

Geography
Wuqiu consists of Greater Qiu Islet (Dàqiū yǔ) and Smaller Qiu Islet (Xiǎoqiū yǔ, Hsia Hsü ) with a total area of 1.2 km2, not to be confused with two islets Daqiu Island and Xiaoqiu Island lying off the north coast off Beigan in the Matsu Islands (Lienchiang County). The islands are considered a basepoint of the Chinese territorial sea by the PRC.

Government and politics

Administrative divisions
Wuqiu township is made up of two rural villages:
 Daqiu Village
 Xiaoqiu Village

Elections

Presidential elections 
113 residents of Wuqiu participated in the 2020 Taiwanese presidential election.

Mayors
Yang Jui-Ta
Li I-Chiang
Tsai Yuan-Chen
Chen Hsing-Chiu
Tsai Yung-Fu

Military
The Wuqiu Islands Garrison Command ( - Wūqiū Shǒubèi Dàduì) defends the islands. The Republic of China Navy has deployed twenty XTR-102 systems in Wuqiu.

Demographics

There are 400 people with household registration in Wuqiu Township. The total population living on the islands fluctuates with the seasons.

Economy
Due to its location surrounded by ocean, fishing is the primary source of income for its residents.

Infrastructure
Drinking water is provided to the residents by using reverse osmosis equipment. Generators are used to improve power shortages.

Transportation
Ferry services and resupply between Greater Kinmen and Daqiu is run by the military every fifteen days. Transportation between Daqiu and Xiaoqiu (900 meters apart) was historically carried out by sampan. In 2008, the county government received a subsidy to build a boat for the township.

Ferry connection is available to the Port of Taichung on Taiwan.

Culture
The languages spoken in Wuqiu are the native Pu-Xian Min (Hinghwa dialect) and  Mandarin Chinese. The residents of other islands in Kinmen (Quemoy) County speak  Quanzhou dialect of Min-Nan (Hokkien).

Tourist attractions
 Wuqiu Lighthouse

See also
 Kinmen
 List of islands of Taiwan

References

External links

 Wuqiu Township Office
 Fujian Provincial Government website 
Satellite image of the islands of Wuchiu and Hsiaochiu by Google Maps
Locator map of Wuqiu 
紀錄觀點【烏坵.ROC】(導演:柯金源) ('Viewpoints: Wuchiu, ROC (Director: Chin-Yuan Ke)') 
2017/9/1 南部開講-在地旅行 烏坵軍旅記憶小旅行 ('South Taiwan Talk- Area Travelling  A Walk Down Memory Lane: Wuchiou Military Memories') 
一個最難到達的鄉鎮﹣用心看烏坵(金門縣烏坵鄉) ('The Hardest Township to Reach- Understanding Wuchiu (Wuchiu Township, Kinmen County)') 

 
Islands of Fujian, Republic of China